Kai Erik Herlovsen (born 25 September 1959) is a Norwegian football coach and former player.

Herlovsen was usually used in the central defence or as a defensive midfielder. He was capped 34 times for Norway, and played in the 1984 Summer Olympics. On club level he began and ended his career in Fredrikstad, with a seven-year-long professional spell in Borussia Mönchengladbach in between.

He currently coaches Lisleby FK. His daughter Isabell Herlovsen is a current Norway international.

References

Expatriate footballers in Germany
Norwegian footballers
Norway international footballers
Borussia Mönchengladbach players
Fredrikstad FK players
Bundesliga players
Olympic footballers of Norway
Footballers at the 1984 Summer Olympics
Norwegian football managers
1959 births
Living people
Norwegian expatriate footballers
Association football defenders
Norwegian expatriate sportspeople in Germany
Sportspeople from Fredrikstad

Association football midfielders